Matteo Corazzi (born 10 September 1994) is an Italian rugby union player.
His usual position is as a Flanker.

He played for Mogliano in Top12 from 2013 to 2021.  

From 2015 to 2017 Corazzi was named in the Emerging Italy squad for the annual World Rugby Nations Cup.

References

External links
It's Rugby England Profile
Eurosport Profile

Mogliano Rugby players
1994 births
Living people
Rugby union flankers